Støv på hjernen is a 1961 Danish film directed by Poul Bang and starring Helle Virkner. It is a remake of the Norwegian film Støv på hjernen from 1959.

Plot
The film follows a group of people in the fictional housing estate Solvænget at Lykkevej 2.

Cast

 Helle Virkner as Fru Bodil Henriksen
 Søren Elung Jensen as Hr. Arne Henriksen
 Dirch Passer as Alf Thomsen
 Hanne Borchsenius as Frk. Monalisa Jacobsen
 Bodil Udsen as Fru Rigmor Hansen
 Ove Sprogøe as Hr. Thorbjørn Hansen
 Karin Nellemose as Fru Birthe Mynster
 Emil Hass Christensen as Hr. Mogens Mynster
 Beatrice Palner as Fru Lene Svendsen
 Henning Palner as Hr. Viggo Svendsen
 Paul Hagen as Sælgeren
 Karl Stegger as Hr. Tim Feddersen
 Ingrid Langballe as Fru Bolette Feddersen
 Else Kornerup as Sælger ved husmodermøde
 Kitty Beneke as Fru Kristoffersen
 Børge Møller Grimstrup as Mand der vil have stilhed
 Miskow Makwarth as Gæst hos Mynster
 Bjørn PuggaardasMüller as Bibliotekar
 Gunnar Lemvigh as Repræsentant fra 'Pral'
 Gunnar Bigum as Scooter forhandler
 Jan PriiskornasSchmidt as Claus Henriksen
 Ralf Dujardin as Thomas Henriksen
 Edith Hermansen as Hustru til mand, der vil have stilhed
 Alex Suhr as Taxaaschauffør
 Klaus Nielsen as Gæst hos Mynster

Production
Voldfløjen 2-4 in Husum, a suburb of Copenhagen, was used as location for the scenes at Solvænget. The real building has no dormers, the one seen in the film where Monalisa Jacobsen (Hanne Borchsenius) lives is based on studio recordings.

References

External links

1961 films
1960s Danish-language films
Films directed by Poul Bang
Films scored by Sven Gyldmark
Remakes of Norwegian films